Shahin Nassirinia (born 25 February 1976 in Shiraz) is an Iranian weightlifter who won the gold medal in the Men's 85 kg weight class at the 1999 World Weightlifting Championships. He participated in the 2000 Sydney Olympics but got injured in the first attempt at Snatch lift.

Major results

References

External links
 
 
 
 

1976 births
Living people
World Weightlifting Championships medalists
Iranian male weightlifters
Iranian strength athletes
Olympic weightlifters of Iran
Weightlifters at the 2000 Summer Olympics
Weightlifters at the 2004 Summer Olympics
Asian Games gold medalists for Iran
People from Malayer
Iranian sportspeople in doping cases
Asian Games medalists in weightlifting
Weightlifters at the 1998 Asian Games
Weightlifters at the 2002 Asian Games
Medalists at the 1998 Asian Games